RAC or Rac may refer to:

Organizations
 Radio Amateurs of Canada
 RATCH-Australia Corporation, electricity generator
 Refugee Action Collective (Victoria), Melbourne, Australia
 Religious Action Center of Reform Judaism, US
 Rent-A-Center, US company
 Riverside Arts Council, California, USA
 Royal African Company, trading slaves and commodities
 Royal Automobile Club (disambiguation), several motoring organisations
 RAC Limited, a British motorists' services company
 RAC Foundation, a British motoring advocacy group
 Ryukyu Air Commuter, an affiliate of Japan Airlines

Military
 Royal Armoured Corps of the British Army
 Romanian Air Corps, the air arm of the Romanian Army in WWI

Sport
 RAC Arena (Perth)
 Retriever Activities Center, multi-purpose arena, Catonsville, Maryland, US
 Rutgers Athletic Center, multi-purpose arena, Piscataway, New Jersey, US
 Racing Athletic Club Casablanca, Morocco

Music
 RAC 1, a radio station in Catalonia, Spain
 Recording Artists' Coalition, US
 RAC (musician), stage name of André Allen Anjos
 Rock Against Communism, racist concerts

Computing
 Oracle RAC, Real Application Clusters
 Reliability Analysis Component, one of the management features new to Windows Vista

People
 Rác (surname)
 Rác (ethnonym) or Rascians, an early modern name for Serbs
 Rac Slider (born 1933), retired baseball player

Other uses
 John H. Batten Airport, Racine, Wisconsin, USA, IATA airport identifier
 Rac (GTPase), a subfamily of G proteins
 Recovery Audit Contractor, US program to find improper medical payments
 Reservation against Cancellation, a booking option of Indian Railways
 Ratchet And Clank, Video game series developed by Insomniac Games.
 Racecourse station (MTR), Hong Kong, MTR station code
 Ryukyu Air Commuter ICAO Airlines Code